The Battle of Thannuris (Tannuris) (or Battle of Mindouos) was fought between the forces of the Eastern Roman (Byzantine) Empire under Belisarius and the Persian Sasanian Empire under Xerxes in summer 528, near Dara in northern Mesopotamia.

The attempt to build a new frontier fort at Thannuris/Mindouos by the Byzantines triggered a Sasanian military response. The Byzantines further reinforced the area, but the Sasanian force managed to defeat their superior opponent by stratagem and many Byzantines were killed or captured along with their commanders. The Sasanians demolished the partially-built fort, but their losses were high and they did not advance further.

Sources
The description provided by Procopius is quite terse. Other sources include John Malalas and Zachariah of Mitylene.

Background
After the death of the emperor Justin I in 527, his successor Justinian I was determined to continue the war against the Sassanid Empire. He appointed Belisarius as magister militum of the East and put him in charge of strengthening the Byzantine positions and building a new fortress near Dara to protect the region from Persian raids. Thannuris appeared to be a convenient place for a city and a military force to be stationed but the current fort was vulnerable. He began firstly by overseeing the strengthening of the fortifications.

The Persians considered any new frontier fort as a threat and threatened to invade if the construction is not stopped. Justinian responded by reinforcing Belisarius with the duces of Phoenice Libanensis Coutzes and Bouzes, the dux of Phoenicia Proclianus (according to Malalas), Sebastianus, Vincentius, comes Basilius, some Isaurians, and Ghassanid Arabs under their king Jabalah IV ibn al-Harith (Tapharas). Syvänne estimates the strength of the infantry to be at least 10,000 and that of the cavalry to be 30,000. He argues that the combined Byzantine army must have been superior in numbers, but the fact that Belisarius was only a dux limited his authority over other duces. At the same time, a Persian army under Peroz Mihran and prince Xerxes with 30,000 men invaded Mesopotamia.

Battle

As the building operations were progressing, the Persian army rose up. Despite the Byzantine efforts, the Persians managed to close up to the walls and breach them. Belisarius tried to counter-attack with his cavalry but was defeated and retreated to Dara.

The exact course of the Persian campaign is poorly recorded in primary sources, which have often compressed the events of the battles of Thannuris and Mindouos into one. In the narrative that portrays them as separate battles, the battle of Thannuris took place before Mindouos, and is depicted as the Persians luring the Roman infantry into a trap where they fell into deep holes and were killed or captured. According to Zacharias of Mitylene, the mounted Romans escaped with Belisarius to Dara, but the infantrymen were killed and captured.

The end of the battle was disastrous for the Byzantine army. Belisarius and the cavalry escaped, but two commanders were killed and three captured. Jabalah IV ibn al-Harith, ruler of the Ghassanids, who fought under Belisarius' command as a Byzantine vassal, fell from his horse and was killed by the Persians. Coutzes's fate is uncertain. Procopius writes that he was taken prisoner and never seen again, while Zacharias of Mytilene records that he was killed. Proclianus was killed in action. Sebastian and Basil were both captured.

Aftermath
After the battle, the foundations of the new fortress were left in the hands of the Persians who then began to destroy them. The Byzantine army retreated to Dara, but some of the infantry died of thirst on the march.

Despite their victory, the Persians suffered heavy losses and then retreated behind the frontier. In particular, the loss of 500 Immortals made the king of Persia Kavadh I angry. Despite his victory, the general Xerxes was disgraced shortly after the battle by Kavadh I.

The Byzantine emperor Justinian sent additional troops to reinforce the border fortresses of Amida, Constantia, Edessa, Sura and Beroea. He also raised a new army which was placed under the command of Pompeius, but a severe winter interrupted further operations until the end of the year.

Belisarius would later be accused of incompetence because of this battle and the one later fought at Callinicum but all charges against him were cleared by an inquiry.

According to Irfan Shahid, the Persians adopted the tactic of using trenches from the Hephthalites in the disastrous war of 484. Belisarius subsequently adopted it from the Persians and used it at the Battle of Dara two years later, and Muhammad also somehow adopted it from the Persians—possibly via the Ghassanid Arabs who saw their king killed at Thannuris—and used it at the Battle of the Ditch a hundred years later.

Battle of Mindouos
It has been argued by historian Ian Hughes that the Battle of Mindouos was a separate battle taking place shortly after the Battle of Thannuris instead of being one event.

See also 
 Battle of Dara
Battle of Mindouos
 Iberian War

References

Sources

Battles of the Roman–Sasanian Wars
520s conflicts
520s in the Byzantine Empire
6th century in Iran
528
Iberian War